The railway town of Crewe in Cheshire, England, contains 34 buildings recorded in the National Heritage List for England as designated listed buildings. Each is at Grade II, the lowest of the three gradings given to listed buildings, and applied to "buildings of national importance and special interest".  Until the Grand Junction Railway established a railway station in 1837, Crewe was a "tiny township with a few farms".  There are only two listed buildings dating from before the arrival of the railway: a much altered farmhouse that probably originated in the 16th century and a timber-framed farmhouse dating from the late 17th century. In 1842 the locomotive works opened, and Crewe had become an important railway junction, with lines coming from Birmingham and the south, and then going on to Chester, Manchester, and Liverpool.  Houses were built to accommodate the railway workers.  Most of these have been demolished, but some have survived and have been listed; these are in Betley, Dorfold, Tollitt, and Victoria Streets.  There is also a surviving manager's house at 47 Delamere Street.

Churches and chapels were built to serve the workers, and seven survivors, or part-survivors are listed.  With the development of the town came civic buildings, listed examples of which include the Municipal Building, the Market Hall, an orphanage, and a theatre.  Notable educational establishments are the listed Ruskin Road School and a teacher-training college now part of Manchester Metropolitan University.  To provide a place of recreation for the workers, the railway established Queens Park in 1887–88, commissioning Edward Kemp to assist in its design.  The listed buildings in the park are its two lodges, a clock tower, and a memorial to those lost in the South African Wars.  Later, in 1922, came a memorial to the First World War, which was originally sited in the Market Square.  In 2020 another war memorial was listed to remember workers from the Crewe tranship shed.

See also

Listed buildings in Crewe Green
Listed buildings in Haslington
Listed buildings in Moston
Listed buildings in Warmingham
Listed buildings in Weston
Listed buildings in Wistaston
Listed buildings in Woolstanwood

Notes and references
Notes

Citations

Sources

 

 

Listed buildings in the Borough of Cheshire East
Lists of listed buildings in Cheshire